Sami Tamminen (born: 17 February 1971) is a sailor from Espoo, Finland. who represented his country at the 2000 Summer Olympics in Sydney, Australia as crew member in the Soling. With helmsman Jali Mäkilä and fellow crew member Eki Heinonen they took the 15th place.

References

Living people
1971 births
Sailors at the 2000 Summer Olympics – Soling
Olympic sailors of Finland
Finnish male sailors (sport)
Sportspeople from Espoo